The simple station La Campiña is part of the TransMilenio mass-transit system of Bogotá, Colombia, which opened in the year 2000.

Location

The station is located in northwestern Bogotá, specifically on Avenida Suba between Carreras 98B and 100.

It serves the La Campiña, Java, and El Poa neighborhoods.

History

In 2006, phase two of the TransMilenio system was completed, including the Avenida Suba line, on which this station is located.

The station is named La Campiña for the neighborhood located across Avenida Suba to the north.

Station services

Main line service

Feeder routes

This station does not have connections to feeder routes.

Inter-city service

This station does not have inter-city service.

External links
TransMilenio

See also
Bogotá
TransMilenio
List of TransMilenio Stations

TransMilenio
Railway stations opened in 2006